Macukull is a village and a former municipality in the Dibër County, northern Albania. At the 2015 local government reform it became a subdivision of the municipality Mat. The population at the 2011 census was 1,565.

Demographic history
Macukull (Maçukli) is recorded in the Ottoman defter of 1467 as a settlement belonging to the timar of Ali in the vilayet of Mati. The village had a total of 11 households which were represented by the following household heads: Lazar Gjyrka, Gjergj Gjika, Lazar Stojko, Nik Mazaraku, Pal Vishlati, Todor Vishlati, Lazar Urani, Kola Budi, Petra Firuni, Mihal Kalovaxhi, and Dimitri Gurbanëshi.

References

Former municipalities in Dibër County
Administrative units of Mat (municipality)
Villages in Dibër County